In Schenkerian analysis, a structural level is a representation of a piece of music at a different level of abstraction, with levels typically including foreground, middleground, and background. According to Schenker musical form is "an energy transformation, as a transformation of the forces that flow from background to foreground through the levels."

For example, while details such as melodic notes exist at the lowest structural levels, the foreground, in the background the fundamental structure is the most basic structural level of all tonal music, representing the digression from and necessary return to the tonic that motivates musical form. It may be conceived of in a specific piece as the opening in the tonic and the return to the tonic with a perfect authentic cadence (V-I) after the development of sonata allegro form.

Strata is the translation given by John Rothgeb for Schichten ("Levels") as described by Oswald Jonas in his Introduction to the Theory of Heinrich Schenker. This translation did not gain wide acceptance in modern Schenkerian literature and the translation of Schichten as "levels" usually has been preferred.

See also
Klang (music)
Prolongation
Urlinie

Sources

Schenkerian analysis